Pa-kimchi, also known as green onion kimchi or scallion kimchi, is one of types of Kimchi that Koreans usually eat for banchan (traditional side dishes) and is most popular in Jeolla-do. Pa Kimchi uses medium-thick green onions known as jjokpa, which are fermented to maturity in powdered red pepper gochutgaru, garlic, ginger and seasoned with myeolchi jeot (salted anchovies). It is known for its hot spicy taste. Green onions with large, white sections is appropriate in making different kinds of kimchi due to their high sweetness.

Among over 100 different types of Kimchi in Korea, Pa Kimchi is considered to be the easiest recipe to make. Also, it becomes flavorful when it is ripened. South Koreans also add either fermented anchovies or fermented brine shrimp (saeujeot), depending on the region. This is similar to other parts of Asia such as the Chinese using fish sauce to enhance the taste of their food.

Ingredients 
Scallions (thin and soft), red-hot pepper powder, minced garlic, minced ginger, salted anchovies, and agave syrup or other sugar (essential to fermentation)

Variations of Pa Kimchi 
Pa-Kimchi Pancake (Hangul: 파김치전)

Ingredients: portion of Pa Kimchi, Flour, eggs and squid

How to make: 1. Slice portion of Pa Kimchi and squid to a convenient size 2. In a mixing bowl containing Pa Kimchi and squid, add a cup of water, 2 eggs 3. Mix and add more water if necessary then fry.

Health 
Green onions are commonly used as a medicine to treat viral infections, flu, and the common cold.

Nutritional composition of Pa Kimchi

See also

 List of onion dishes

References 

Kimchi
Scallion dishes